This list of flags of regions of Italy shows the flags of the 20 Italian regions (including five autonomous regions). These regions have their own arms, as well as their own gonfalone; more recently they have taken into use normal flags as well. Many regional flags were adopted on 4 November 1995 for Armed Forces Day of Italy.

Regions

Autonomous regions

See also
Flag of Italy
List of Italian flags

External links
Clickable map of Italian regions

 
Italy regions
Italian culture
Italy geography-related lists
Italy